Constantin Adam (born 12 July 1996) is a Romanian rower. He competed in the men's coxless four event at the 2016 Summer Olympics.

References

External links
 

1996 births
Living people
Romanian male rowers
Olympic rowers of Romania
Rowers at the 2016 Summer Olympics
Place of birth missing (living people)
Rowers at the 2020 Summer Olympics